Miss Universe Thailand 2021 was the 22nd edition of the Miss Universe Thailand pageant. It was held on October 24, 2021 at the NICE of Nong Nooch Tropical Garden in Pattaya, Thailand. Miss Universe Thailand 2020, Amanda Obdam, crowned Anchilee Scott-Kemmis as her successor at the end of the event. She represented Thailand at the Miss Universe 2021 competition held in Eilat, Israel but was unplaced.

30 contestants will participate in this year's competition. The pageant will be hosted by Piyawat Kempetch in his third consecutive year. Beauty camp will be held at Khao Yai National Park in Pak Chong, Nakhon Ratchasima. This will be the first time the pageant will air as a reality show on TrueID. The final competition will be broadcast by PPTV HD and TrueID.

This edition will mark the first year the competition to be lead under Punika Kulsoontornrut's managership. In addition of being the manager for the pageant, she will also be the runway coach. Punika had previously been placed as 2nd Runner-up at the previous edition.

Background

Location and date 

On September 6, 2021, TPN Global Co., Ltd. announced that the preliminary and final competition for the Miss Universe Thailand 2021 pageant will be held on October 22 and October 24 respectively, at True Icon Hall of Iconsiam in Bangkok. Beauty camp will be held from October 9 to 15 while the swimsuit presentation will be held on October 19. Both events will be held at Khao Yai National Park in Pak Chong, Nakhon Ratchasima.

Selection of participants  
On September 6, 2021, TPN Global Co., Ltd. launched the participant selection process for the Miss Universe Thailand 2021 pageant. The process begins with the submission of a candidate's application to TPN Global Co., Ltd. The final submission of application is scheduled to be on September 19, 2021.

On September 26, 2021, TPN Global Co., Ltd. revealed the Top 63 candidates. The audition day and Top 30 announcement was held on October 1, 2021 and the eight candidates who received the Golden Tiara Award at the audition were automatically advanced to the Top 30.

Team expert 
On September 6, 2021, TPN Global Co., Ltd. announced the pageant experts and coaches for the Miss Universe Thailand 2021 pageant.
Rossukon Gonggate –  Acting coach and human skills developer
Punika Kulsoontornrut –  Runway coach
Thitipong Duangkong –  Speech content
Varistha Nakornthap –  Speech content
Vinij Boonchaisri –  Head of make up by L'Oréal Paris
Wachira Manowong –  Choreographer
Thitipan Raksasat –  Director of MUT Ringside Reality

MUT Reality Live: Exclusive Content 

An eight-episode reality show entitled "MUT Reality Live: Exclusive Content" will release on MUT Reality Live Channel via TrueID, and could be viewed for a one-time fee. This list is the episode of MUT Reality Live: Exclusive Content.

Challenge winners

Prize 
On September 6, 2021, TPN Global Co., Ltd. announced the prize money amounts. In addition to the prize money, the winner will receive a brand-new Mouawad crown called "Flame of Passion", AssetWise condominium, Honda Civic Eleventh-generation Turbo RS, and digital asset, cryptocurrency.

฿5,000 – To each contestants advanced to the Top 63 (63 contestants)
฿10,000 – To each contestants advanced to the Top 30 (30 contestants)
฿100,000 – 4th Runner-up
฿100,000 – 3rd Runner-up
฿300,000 – 2nd Runner-up
฿500,000 – 1st Runner-up
฿1,000,000 – Winner

'Flame of Passion' crown 
On September 6, 2021, Fred Mouawad launched the name of a brand-new Mouawad crown for the Miss Universe Thailand 2021 pageant as "Flame of Passion". This crown is the second generation of the Mouawad crown for the Miss Universe Thailand pageant. The releasing event of the 'Flame of Passion' crown will be on October 22, 2021 during the preliminary competition.

Sponsorship 
This list is the main sponsorship for Miss Universe Thailand 2021 pageant.

True 5G
PPTV HD
Mouawad
AssetWise
Bota-P

Aotura & MUT Select
L'Oréal Paris
BitKub
Honda
TikTok

Results

Placements
Color keys

§ – Voted into the Top 10 by online fans

Special awards

Miss Real Passion

Best in National Costume

Pageant

Format 
The twenty semifinalists will be chosen from the initial pool of 30 contestants through a closed-door interview, a swimsuit presentation, and a preliminary competition, which featured contestants competing in swimsuit and evening gown. As was introduced in the 2020 competition, popular voting will determine a contestant advancing to the Top 10, so there are nine remaining spots for these semifinalists.

Preliminary competition 
The preliminary competition will be held on October 22, 2021, at NICE of Nong Nooch Tropical Garden in Pattaya. It will feature contestants competing in swimsuit and evening gown. It was hosted by Piyawat Kempetch and Amanda Obdam.

Final competition 
The final competition will be held on October 24, 2021, at NICE of Nong Nooch Tropical Garden in Pattaya.

Selection committee 
Interview 
Amanda Obdam – Actress, model, and beauty pageant titleholder who was crowned Miss Universe Thailand 2020
Chanya Wisetsiri – Head of brand & communication of Bitkub Capital Group Holdings
Charamphon Wattanakasemnat – Marketing director of Bota-P World
Maria Poonlertlarp – Actress, model, singer, and beauty pageant titleholder who was crowned Miss Universe Thailand 2017
Narong Lertkitsiri – Managing director of TPN Global and National director of Miss Universe Thailand
Panadda Wongphudee️️ – Actress, model, host, singer, DJ and beauty pageant titleholder who was crowned Miss Thailand 2000
Panchana Wattanasatian – President of Khao Yai Tourism Association and founder of "Food For Fighter" project
Pongrapee Buranasompob – Expert in human potential development
Piyaporn Sankosik – Managing director of TPN Global and National director of Miss Universe Thailand
Risa Honghiran – Professional certified coach and beauty pageant titleholder who placed 1st Runner-up at Miss Thailand World 1988
Rossukon Gonggate – Expert in communication skills and personality
Taneth Laksanavilas – Expert in beauty pageant and co-founder of T-Pageant 
Thitipong Duangkong – Lecturer in Women's and Latin American Studies
Preliminary competition
Panadda Wongphudee️️ – Actress, model, host, singer, DJ and beauty pageant titleholder who was crowned Miss Thailand 2000
Kriengkrai Kanjanapokin – CEO of Index Creative Village plc.
Praveenar Singh – Beauty pageant titleholder who placed 1st Runner-up at Miss Universe Thailand 2020
Chalita Suansane – Actress, model, and beauty pageant titleholder who was crowned Miss Universe Thailand 2016
Risa Honghiran – Professional certified coach and beauty pageant titleholder who placed 1st Runner-up at Miss Thailand World 1988
Suraphon Peerapongpipat – Executive director of PPTVHD36
Kittipong Weeratecha – Chief Brand and Communications Executive of True Corporation
Prasert Jermjuttham – Pageant expert
Noranit Praniti – Interior designer
Chanya Wisetsiri – Head of brand & communication of Bitkub Capital Group Holdings
Wassana Lertpongsophon – Chief Marketing Officer of Assetwise
Sukanya Kirawittaya – Brand general manager of L'Oréal Paris Thailand
Wassana Wattanakasemnat – Chief Executive Officer of Bota-P World
Laksmi Chong – User & Content Operations Lead of TikTok Thailand
Woraphon Sukheewattana – Managing Director of Dr. Tony Medical Center
Final competition
Araya Alberta Hargate – Actress, model, host, television personality, cover girl, and L'Oréal Paris brand ambassador
Panadda Wongphudee – Actress, model, host, singer, DJ and beauty pageant titleholder who was crowned Miss Thailand 2000
Chalita Suansane – Actress, model, and beauty pageant titleholder who was crowned Miss Universe Thailand 2016
Maria Poonlertlarp – Actress, model, singer, and beauty pageant titleholder who was crowned Miss Universe Thailand 2017
Kanokkorn Jaicheun – Miss Thailand World 2007
Nutthamanee Lekvanichkul – Deputy Director of Brands and Communications of True Corporation
Risa Honghiran – Professional certified coach and beauty pageant titleholder who placed 1st Runner-up at Miss Thailand World 1988
Wassana Lertpongsophon – Chief marketing officer of Assetwise
Wassana Wattanakasemnat – Chief Executive Officer of Bota-P World
Wimonluck Chuchat –  Director of the Office of Contemporary Art and Culture (NESDB)
Panchana Wattanasatian – President of Khao Yai Tourism Association and founder of "Food For Fighter" project
Chanya Wisetsiri – Head of brand & communication of Bitkub Capital Group Holdings

Contestants 

30 contestants will compete for the title of Miss Universe Thailand 2021:

Crossovers and returnees

Provincial pageants

Miss Chiang Mai
 2020: Kansuda Chanakeeree (1st Runner-up)

Miss Nakhon Ratchasima
 2020: Surarak Kairsungnoen (Winner)

Nang Phanom Mat Sukhothai
 2018: Assuntina Chusak

Miss Grand  Chanthaburi-Trat-Rayong
 2021: Sornswan Wanboon (TBA)
 2020: Assuntina Chusak (1st Runner-up)

Miss Grand Nonthaburi
 2021: Nichnita Chatthirarat

Miss Grand Pathum Thani
 2021: Sornswan Wanboon
 2021: Sirinya Sangngarmplung

Miss Grand Phangnga
 2021: Sornswan Wanboon

Miss Grand Samut Sakhon
 2021: Natthakan Kunchayawanat

Miss Grand Sa Kaeo
 2021: Suttida Chaiyakam (TBA)

Miss Grand Bangkok
 2020: Wanida Dokkularb (1st Runner-up)

Miss Grand Chonburi
 2020: Wanida Dokkularb (Winner)
 2020: Assuntina Chusak

Miss Grand Kanchanaburi
 2020: Suttida Chaiyakam (2nd runner-up)

Miss Grand Supanburi
 2020: Suttida Chaiyakam (1st Runner-up)

Miss Grand Phuket
 2019: Tharina Botes (Winner)

Miss Grand Sakon Nakhon
 2019: Kanokporn Markpolsombat (Winner)

National pageants
Miss Thailand World
2012: Pimnara Vonzurmuehlen (Top 5)

Miss Universe Thailand
 2020: Chatikarn Suwannakote	
 2019: Kansuda Chanakeeree (Top 20)

Miss Grand Thailand
2020: Wanida Dokkularb (Top 20)
2019: Tharina Botes (Top 10)
2019: Kasama Suetrong (Top 10)
2019: Kanokporn Markpolsombat
2022: Kansuda Chanakeeree (Top 20)

Thai Supermodel Contest
2019: Sarinthorn Kathleen Branston (Top 10)
2018: Karima Sakuntan (Top 10)
2018: Pheeraya Phuangsombut

Miss Model Thailand
2018: Kasama Suetrong (Winner)

Miss Tourism Queen Thailand
2017: Kasama Suetrong (2nd Runner–Up)

Miss Teen Thailand
2016: Kornkanok Porametthanuwat

The Face Thailand
2014: Yhok Sirimart (Rank 9)

 Miss South Africa
 2018: Tharina Botes (Top 12)

International pageants

Miss International
 2016: Tharina Botes (as )

Miss Grand International

Miss Model of the World 
 2018: Tharina Botes (as '')
 2018: Kasama Suetrong (Top 36)

Notes

References

External links

TrueID exclusive website

2021
2021 in Thailand
2021 beauty pageants
Beauty pageants in Thailand
MUT Ringside Reality
MUT Ringside Reality